Metacrisiodes is a monotypic moth genus in the subfamily Arctiinae. Its only species, Metacrisiodes pua, is found in Mexico. Both the genus and species were first described by Harrison Gray Dyar Jr. in 1916.

References

External links

Arctiini
Monotypic moth genera